Thomas Tomlinson (born 1945) is a philosophy professor and medical ethicist currently teaching at Michigan State University, where he holds a joint appointment in the Lyman Briggs College and the philosophy department.

Tomlinson earned his M.A. and Ph.D in philosophy at Michigan State. He teaches courses on medical ethics, nursing ethics, and veterinary ethics.

Contributions to philosophy
Tomlinson has published widely in medical ethics literature. He is especially interested in resuscitation decisions, organ donation and determinations of death, and ethical aspects of international research.

Professional publications
Tomlinson authored the book Nursing Ethics. In addition, he authored several articles in journals such as The Journal of Medical Ethics, The Journal of Clinical Ethics, The Kennedy Institute of Ethics Journal, The Journal of Medicine and Philosophy, The Hastings Center Report, Academic Medicine, and The Gerontologist 31.

Selected works
 
 Tomlinson, Thomas P. "Ethical Issues" (Chapter 12). In Palliative Practices: An Interdisciplinary Approach. Ed. Kuebler KK, Davis MP, Moore CD. St. Louis, Elsevier-Mosby: 2005
 
 Tomlinson, Thomas P. "Telethics and the Virtual Intensivist." Journal of Clinical Ethics 12 (Spring) 2001:69-72.
 "On Being Genetically 'Irresponsible'" Judith Andre, Leonard Fleck, Tom Tomlinson. Kennedy Institute of Ethics Journal, June 2000.
 
 
 Tomlinson, Thomas P. "Perplexed about Narrative Ethics",in Stories and Their Limits: Narrative Approaches to Bioethics, ed. Hilde Nelson. Routledge, 1997.

See also
Environmental ethics

References 

1945 births
Living people
American philosophers
Michigan State University alumni
Michigan State University faculty
Bioethicists